Billy Boy & Mary Lou is a studio album by American country music artists Bill Anderson and Mary Lou Turner. It was released in June 1977 on MCA Records and was produced by Buddy Killen. It was the duo's second studio album together since pairing up as a duet team in the mid 1970s. The album produced two singles between 1977 and 1978. It would be the duo's final studio album together.

Background and content
Billy Boy & Mary Lou was Anderson and Turner's second studio release together. The pair began collaborating after Anderson's former duet partner (Jan Howard) left his road show for personal reasons. Turner replaced her and their first studio album together was issued in 1976 and featured a number one hit single. Billy Boy & Mary Lou would be their second and final studio recording together. It was produced by Buddy Killen in March 1977 at Bradley's Barn, a studio located in Mount Juliet, Tennessee. The album was a collection of ten tracks. It included three compositions written by Anderson himself. They included "Children" and "We Made Love (But Where's the Love We Made)", which both appeared on "side two" of the record. Additional tracks were original recordings that were composed by several different songwriters. Writers Curly Putman and Sonny Throckmorton composed four of the album's tracks.

Release and reception
Billy Boy & Mary Lou was released in June 1977 on MCA Records. It was issued as a vinyl record with five songs on both sides of the record. The album spent five weeks on the Billboard Top Country Albums chart before peaking at number 39 in October 1977. Billy Boy & Mary Lou was Turner's final chart appearance on the latter chart. The album included two singles released between 1977 and 1978. The first single, "Where Are You Going Billy Boy", was released in June 1977. Spending 12 weeks on the Billboard Hot Country Singles chart, it reached a peak position of 18 on the latter chart. The single also climbed to number 22 on the Canadian RPM Country Singles chart.

A second single was released to radio in January 1978. The track, "I'm Way Ahead of You", peaked at number 25 on the Billboard country songs chart after a ten-week chart run. The single also became a top 40 hit on the RPM Country Singles chart, reaching number 30. The album received a negative review from Allmusic, receiving only two stars. Critic Eugene Chadbourne commented that the songwriting quality was low. Chadbourne highlighted the track, "Country Lay on Mind", in his review. "'Country Lay on My Mind' is not just an example of a substandard theme in country songwriting (i.e., songs about just how darn country the artist is). It drags in sexual metaphors and it is hard to believe these performers weren't aware of what they would wind up with -- take another look at the title to get the point," he commented.

Track listing

Personnel
All credits are adapted from the liner notes of Billy Boy & Mary Lou.

Musical and technical personnel
 Bill Anderson – lead vocals
 Buddy Killen – producer
 Mary Lou Turner – lead vocals

Chart performance

Release history

References

1977 albums
Bill Anderson (singer) albums
Mary Lou Turner albums
MCA Records albums
Vocal duet albums